Luka is a village and a municipality in Croatia in the Zagreb County.

In the 2011 census, there were a total of 1,351 inhabitants in the municipality, in the following settlements:
 Krajska Ves, population 144
 Luka, population 416
 Pluska, population 207
 Vadina, population 185
 Žejinci, population 399

The absolute majority are Croats.

References

External links 
 Official site

Populated places in Zagreb County
Municipalities of Croatia
Zaprešić